Yakubu Abubakar (born 9 February 1990) is a Ghanaian professional footballer who plays as a central midfielder for Bahrain premier league club hidd sc.

Club career
He started his career in Ghana football academies and played in the Ghanaian Premier League teams Red Bull Ghana and Ashanti Gold SC before moving abroad. He has played in the Asia Champions league where he played against Malaysia Darul Johor FC, Indian Super league team Bengaluru FC and Lao Toyota FC.

International career
Abubakar played for Ghana at every youth level, having represented the nation at under-17 and under-20.

References

External links
 - Yakubu Abubakar Soccerway Profile
• - Yakubu Abubakar Zero Site Profile
 - Yakubu Abubakar SoccerKeep Profile
 - Yakubu Abubakar World Football Profile

1990 births
Footballers from Accra
Ghanaian footballers
Association football defenders
Association football midfielders
Ashanti Gold SC players
Al Hala SC players
Ayeyawady United F.C. players
Ghana international footballers
Ghanaian expatriate footballers
Expatriate footballers in Myanmar
Ghanaian expatriate sportspeople in Egypt
Ghanaian expatriate sportspeople in Bahrain
Living people